Andrés Rafael Prieto Urrejola (19 December 1928 – 25 September 2022) was a Chilean football forward who played for Chile in the 1950 FIFA World Cup. He also played for Club Deportivo Universidad Católica.

International career
Prieto represented Chile at youth level in the 1949 Juventud de América Tournament, alongside players such as Misael Escuti, Manuel Álvarez, Arturo Farías, among others.

At senior level, he made 16 appearances for the Chile national team and scored 8 goals.

Personal life and death
His father, Fernando Prieto Concha, nicknamed Palomeque, was one of the founders of C.D. Green Cross as well as a forward of the same club.

Prieto was the older brother of the Chilean former international footballer, Ignacio Prieto. His son, José Antonio or Toño, is a well-known sports journalist in Chilean radio media.

His nickname was Chuleta (Cheat Sheet) since he was a primary student.

Prieto died on 25 September 2022, at the age of 93.

References

External links

Andrés Prieto at PartidosdeLaRoja 

1928 births
2022 deaths
Footballers from Santiago
Chilean footballers
Chile international footballers
Chile youth international footballers
1950 FIFA World Cup players
Association football forwards
Club Deportivo Universidad Católica footballers
RCD Espanyol footballers
Chilean Primera División players
Venezuelan Primera División players
La Liga players
Chilean football managers
San Luis de Quillota managers
Club Deportivo Universidad Católica managers
Colo-Colo managers
Club América managers
Unión Española managers
Huachipato managers
Club Atlético Platense managers
Club Atlético Vélez Sarsfield managers
San Lorenzo de Almagro managers
Liverpool F.C. (Montevideo) managers
Defensor Sporting managers
Cobreloa managers
Deportes Iquique managers
Unión San Felipe managers
Club Bolívar managers
Real Santa Cruz managers
Coquimbo Unido managers
Chilean Primera División managers
Liga MX managers
Argentine Primera División managers
Uruguayan Primera División managers
Bolivian Primera División managers
Primera B de Chile managers
Chilean expatriate footballers
Chilean expatriate football managers
Chilean expatriate sportspeople in Venezuela
Expatriate footballers in Venezuela
Chilean expatriate sportspeople in Spain
Expatriate footballers in Spain
Chilean expatriate sportspeople in Mexico
Expatriate football managers in Mexico
Chilean expatriate sportspeople in Argentina
Expatriate football managers in Argentina
Chilean expatriate sportspeople in Uruguay
Expatriate football managers in Uruguay
Chilean expatriate sportspeople in Bolivia
Expatriate football managers in Bolivia